Office Christmas Party is a 2016 American Christmas comedy film directed by Will Speck and Josh Gordon and written by Justin Malen and Laura Solon, based on a story by Jon Lucas and Scott Moore. The film stars an ensemble cast, including Jason Bateman, Olivia Munn, T.J. Miller, Jillian Bell, Vanessa Bayer, Courtney B. Vance, Rob Corddry, Kate McKinnon, and Jennifer Aniston.

The film was released on December 9, 2016, by Paramount Pictures. It grossed $114 million worldwide.

Plot
Josh Parker, Chief Technology Officer of Zenotek in Chicago, finalizes his divorce and goes to work. The interim CEO Carol Vanstone arrives to notify Josh and branch manager, Clay Vanstone that the company has failed to meet its new quarterly quota. She threatens to lay off 40% of their employees, cut bonuses, and cancel the annual Christmas party. Carol and Clay are siblings having recently lost their father, the former CEO. Clay is desperate to keep his staff and to pay out employee bonuses however, Carol resenting Clay as their dad's favorite, threatens to shut down the branch.

Josh, Clay, and Tracey Hughes, Chief of Research and Development, inform Carol that they have a meeting with financial giant Walter Davis later in the day, so Carol gives them a last chance. Walter likes the pitch, but is concerned, fearing they care more about the budget than their people. Clay invites him to the Christmas party, hoping to show him their company is stable with a healthy employee environment. On the way to the airport Carol stops by Josh's apartment to offer him a position working for her at the New York headquarters at twice his current salary.

Clay funds an exorbitant Christmas party, vexing Mary, head of Human Resources. The party struggles to pick up even with Chicago Bulls player Jimmy Butler present. Initially reluctant, Walter is accidentally doused with cocaine and he livens up. Various employees also cut loose: Nate hired escort Savannah, to pretend to be his girlfriend; Clay's assistant and single mom Allison unsuccessfully tries to hook up with Fred; Jeremy cuts loose dancing with Mary, whom he previously despised. Josh and Tracey nearly kiss on the roof. As Clay wins over Walter, the celebration grows more and more chaotic, including orgies, damaging company property, with heavy alcohol and drugs.

Carol's flight is cancelled due to weather, and she rushes back when she hears about the party from her Uber driver as the party is now the talk of the town with many non-employees in attendance. Though initially impressed with receiving Walter's business, he injures himself attempting to swing off a balcony. It is revealed that Walter was fired from his firm earlier, nullifying the contract and leaving Zenotek helpless. Carol decides to immediately shut down the branch.

Carol then loudly mentions her job offer to Josh to everyone, especially Clay. Despite stating he didn't accept it, he is angrily shunned. Tracey was also given an offer by Carol but explicitly rejected it, where he kept it open. Feeling betrayed, Clay rushes off with Savannah's unstable pimp, Trina, to party elsewhere, though she is more interested in robbing him of his wealth which he has on his person. Josh, Tracey, Mary, and ultimately Carol race to save him.

Hearing the branch is being terminated instigates a riot, destroying everything in sight. Josh authorizes security guard Carla to shut down the party. Clay races Trina's car towards an opening drawbridge, attempting to jump the gap, a feat he'd earlier mentioned to Josh. Driving Mary's minivan alongside him, Josh tries to convince Clay not to jump, but he is still upset. Convinced he's a failure he still wants to jump, dead or alive. After everyone fails to convince Clay to pull over, Josh threatens to join him, and Clay agrees. Scared of dying, Carol takes the wheel, swerving into Clay's car and causing him to veer off and crash into an internet hub, disconnecting the entire city.

Trina and Savannah are arrested, while Clay is taken to the hospital. The internet blackout inspires Tracey to implement an innovation combining internet Wi-Fi with wire connections through the power grid, which had previously failed. They race back to the destroyed office to set up her tech, it works and internet is restored to Chicago.

The innovation saves the entire branch, with Clay apologizing for how his father treated Carol. Walter, in the same hospital, agrees to join the team. Josh and Tracey kiss amidst the ruins of the office. Jeremy opens up to Mary, and Nate and Allison agree to go on a date. Everyone meets Carol and Clay at the hospital, and they all go out for breakfast, driving recklessly on the way.

Cast
 Jason Bateman as Josh Parker, Chief of Technical Advancement, Zenotek Chicago
 Olivia Munn as Tracey Hughes, Chief of R&D, Zenotek Chicago
 T.J. Miller as Clay Vanstone, Head of Zenotek Chicago
 Jennifer Aniston as Carol Vanstone, interim CEO of Zenotek
 Kate McKinnon as Mary Winetoss, the human resources representative of Zenotek
 Jillian Bell as Trina, a pimp
 Courtney B. Vance as Walter Davis, representative of a huge financial company
 Vanessa Bayer as Allison Parker, Clay's assistant
 Rob Corddry as Jeremy Parker, customer service supervisor
 Karan Soni as Nate Winetoss, IT director
 Sam Richardson as Joel, who serves as DJ during the party
 Randall Park as Fred, a new employee
 Abbey Lee as Savannah, an escort
 Jamie Chung as Meghan
 Da'Vine Joy Randolph as Carla, the security guard
 Fortune Feimster as Lonny, the Uber Driver
 Matt Walsh as Ezra, Josh's divorce lawyer
 Ben Falcone as Doctor
 Chloe Wepper as Kelsey, one of the office workers
 Oliver Cooper as Drew, one of Nate's staff members
 Adrian Martinez as Larry, one of the office workers
 Erick Chavarria as Alan, one of the office workers
 Andrew Leeds as Tim, one of Nate's staff members
 Jimmy Butler as himself
 Michael Tourek as Alexei

Production 
In 2010, Guymon Casady approached Will Speck and Josh Gordon with an original idea of his, to make a movie about a holiday office party. They subsequently set the concept up at DreamWorks Pictures, and it was later rewritten by Lee Eisenberg, Gene Stupnitsky, and Laura Solon. On February 19, 2016, it was announced that Speck and Gordon would also direct the film to be distributed by Paramount Pictures, which would star Jennifer Aniston, Jason Bateman, T.J. Miller, and Kate McKinnon. On March 8, 2016, Randall Park joined the film, and Olivia Munn was cast on March 17. On April 4, 2016, Abbey Lee Kershaw joined the cast. Karan Soni, Da'Vine Joy Randolph, and Jamie Chung were added on April 5, 2016, and on April 6, 2016, Rob Corddry, Andrew Leeds, and Oliver Cooper were cast as well.

Principal photography on the film began late March 2016 in Atlanta, Georgia. In early April, filming took place in Chicago, Illinois, and after that production moved to Hiram, Georgia, where it shot from April 19 to June 1, 2016.

On casting Aniston in the film, Gordon stated, "We created this character for Jennifer because she's absolutely fearless when it comes to playing somewhat unlikeable characters in comedies. For her, the more daring the role, the better."

Release 
Office Christmas Party was released in the United States on December 9, 2016, by Paramount Pictures. Paramount also distributed it internationally, except in several territories where Mister Smith Entertainment handled sales, including the United Kingdom and Australia, where it was handled by Entertainment One.

Reception

Box office
Office Christmas Party grossed $54.8 million in the United States and Canada and $59.7 million in other territories for a worldwide total of $114.5 million, against a production budget of $45 million.

Office Christmas Party was released alongside The Bounce Back and the wide expansions of Miss Sloane and Nocturnal Animals, and was expected to gross $13–15 million from 3,210 theaters in its opening weekend. It went on to make $16.9 million in its opening weekend, finishing second at the box office and on par with recent R-rated comedies like How to Be Single and Sisters. The opening weekend audience was 56% male, and 83% was over the age of 25.

Critical response

Office Christmas Party received mixed reviews from critics. The site's critical consensus reads, "Its cast of gifted comics is good for a handful of laughs, but Office Christmas Partys overstuffed plot ultimately proves roughly as disappointing as its clichéd gags and forced sentimentality." On Metacritic, the film had a weighted average score of 42 out of 100 based on 35 critics, indicating "mixed or average reviews". Audiences polled by CinemaScore gave the film an average grade of "B" on an A+ to F scale. Vanity Fair critic Jordan Hoffman gave the film a positive review, highlighting several comedic performances by the ensemble cast.

Home media
The film was released on Digital HD on March 21, 2017, before being released on DVD and Blu-ray on April 4, 2017.

In Germany the title was changed for the home release, with the film named Dirty Office Party.

See also
 List of Christmas films

References

External links 

 

2016 films
2016 comedy films
2010s Christmas comedy films
2010s English-language films
American Christmas comedy films
DreamWorks Pictures films
Films directed by Will Speck and Josh Gordon
Films produced by Scott Stuber
Films scored by Theodore Shapiro
Films about parties
Films set in 2016
Films set in Chicago
Films set in offices
Films shot in Atlanta
Films shot in Chicago
Films with screenplays by Dan Mazer
Paramount Pictures films
Reliance Entertainment films
Workplace comedy films
2010s American films